Raja Man Singh (born 5 December 1921 – died 21 February 1985) was an Indian politician and titular head of princely Bharatpur State. He was seven-time Independent Member of Legislative Assembly from Deeg assembly constituency from 1952 to 1984. He was the son of Kishan Singh of Bharatpur.

He was killed along with his two supporters in a fake police encounter in February 1985 after an incident of violence in which Rajasthan's then chief minister Shiv Charan Mathur's helicopter was damaged. His murder case was investigated by the CBI. Singh's murder led to the resignation of CM Shiv Charan Mathur. On 20 July 2020, a special CBI court in Mathura convicted 11 policemen, including former Deputy Superintendent of Police Kan Singh Bhati in Raja Man Singh's murder case.

References 

1921 births
1985 deaths
Rajasthani politicians
People from Bharatpur district
People from Bharatpur, Rajasthan
People shot dead by law enforcement officers in India
Extrajudicial killings